Nicholas A. Vincent (born January 11, 1958 Harvey, Illinois) is an American rock and roll, jazz, and studio drummer, producer and composer. His sister is Holly Beth Vincent. He has performed and recorded with artists such as Frank Black, Donny & Marie, Art Garfunkel, John Fogerty, Carole King, Jackie DeShannon, Ann-Margret, Sparklehorse,  Hilary Duff, Hanson, Charlotte Hatherley, Ian McLagan and Roger Miller.

Vincent has done steady television and film soundtrack work, including the films Sideways,  Just Go with It, Grown Ups,  Desperado and From Dusk Till Dawn.

His tenure with Frank Black included playing on Frank Black, Teenager of the Year and The Cult of Ray, and producing the albums Pistolero, Dog in the Sand, Black Letter Days and Show Me Your Tears.

He has been a student of legendary drum teacher Freddie Gruber, and also attended University of North Texas from 1975 to 1978.  Vincent has been a member of the bands Tito & Tarantula,  the Surf Punks, and Chuck E. Weiss and the God Dam Liars.

References

University of North Texas College of Music alumni
1958 births
Living people
People from Harvey, Illinois
20th-century American drummers
American male drummers
American people of Italian descent
Tito & Tarantula members
20th-century American male musicians